The Socialist Alliance intended to be an electoral alliance in Mexico, proposed in November 2005 for the 2006 general elections. The alliance intended to include several Trotskyist factions that split off from the old Revolutionary Workers' Party (PRT). These included:
Socialist Convergence (Convergencia Socialista)
Socialist Unity League (Liga de Unidad Socialista)
Socialist Collective (Colectivo Socialista)
Labor and Socialist Unity (Unidad Obrera y Socialista)

See also
National Assembly of the Socialist Left

2004 in Mexico
2006 elections in Mexico
Far-left politics in Mexico
Left-wing political party alliances
Political organizations based in Mexico
Political party alliances in Mexico
Trotskyist organizations in Mexico
Mexico